Dovedale is a valley in the Peak District of England.

Dovedale or Dove Dale may also refer to:
 Dove Dale, a historic plantation house in South Carolina, U.S.
 Dovedale, Botswana
 Dovedale, New Zealand
 Dovedale cheese, a blue cheese
 Dovedale House, a youth centre in Ilam, Staffordshire, England
 MV Dovedale H, a U.K. Empire ship

See also
 
 Dovetail (disambiguation)